Oh Kwang-rok (born August 28, 1962) is a South Korean actor.

Filmography

Film

Television series

Theater

References

External links 
 Oh Kwang-rok at SidusHQ 
 
 
 

1962 births
Living people
Male actors from Busan
People from Busan
South Korean male film actors
South Korean male television actors
South Korean male stage actors
IHQ (company) artists
20th-century South Korean male actors
21st-century South Korean male actors
Dongbog O clan